"Treat Her Like a Lady" is a song written and recorded by Jamaican reggae singer Diana King for her 1995 album, Tougher Than Love. In 1997, Celine Dion covered the song on her album Let's Talk About Love and released it as a single in Europe in 1999. Dion's version reached top forty in the United Kingdom, Ireland, Austria, and Iceland.

Celine Dion version

"Treat Her Like a Lady" was released as the last single from Celine Dion's 1997 album, Let's Talk About Love. It was issued on 22 March 1999 in Europe. Dion changed some lyrics, thus gaining a co-writing credit. She recorded it together with Diana King and the American girl group Brownstone, who did the backing vocals. Remixes of the song were created by Metro and Ric Wake.

Background and release
The single was released between March and June 1999 in Europe, to support the forthcoming Let's Talk About Love World Tour. The live music video was recorded on 18 December 1998, during Dion's concert in Montreal, Canada. It was directed by Gérard Pullicino. The music video was included on the UK enhanced CD single in June 1999. In 2022, it was uploaded into Dion's official YouTube channel. The performance from the European part of the tour was included on the Au cœur du stade DVD (1999). The studio recording of "Treat Her Like a Lady" was included as the DVD's bonus. In 2022, it was also uploaded into Dion's YouTube channel.

After the success of "My Heart Will Go On", radio stations in Quebec started playing "Treat Her Like a Lady" in May 1998. Because of that, it entered the chart on 30 May 1998 and peaked at number nine. After being oficially released in Europe in 1999, "Treat Her Like a Lady" peaked at number 16 in Austria, number 29 in the UK and number 40 in Ireland. 

On 27 January 2012, Dion performed the song for the first time in 13 years with Diana King as a surprise guest, during her headlining performance at the Jamaica Jazz and Blues Festival. On 17 June 2017, Dion performed "Treat Her Like a Lady" in Copenhagen, Denmark during the opening night of her Live 2017 Tour.

Critical reception
Entertainment Weekly editor David Browne called Dion's cover an "overarranged stab at reggae dancehall" and "unintentionally amusing". The New York Observer editor Jonathan Bernstein wrote, "She's fallen on her face before when attempting to be as one with the rhythm, but Celine Dion has never humiliated herself as comprehensively as she does when mashing it up in a dance-hall style on "Treat Her Like a Lady". As Seinfeld' s George Costanza remarked in a similar situation, "Sweet fancy Moses!"" Steven Wells from NME commented, "Celine raps hardcore radical feminism! Yes she does! She says that we've got to treat women like "ladies". Otherwise they might go "crazy". This is possibly the most profound statement on the subject of women's oppression since Germaine Greer's The Female Eunuch".

Formats and track listings
European CD single
"Treat Her Like a Lady" – 4:05
"To Love You More" (Tony Moran Pop Edit Mix) – 4:53

European CD maxi-single
"Treat Her Like a Lady" – 4:05
"To Love You More" (Tony Moran Pop Edit Mix) – 4:53
"Unison" (Single Dance Mix) – 4:03

UK cassette single
"Treat Her Like a Lady" – 4:05
"Treat Her Like a Lady" (Ric Wake Radio Mix) – 3:34
"The Prayer" (with Andrea Bocelli) – 4:30

UK CD single #1 
"Treat Her Like a Lady" – 4:05
"Treat Her Like a Lady" (The Metro Club Mix) – 7:06
"Treat Her Like a Lady" (Ric Wake Club Mix) – 8:17

UK CD single #2
"Treat Her Like a Lady" (Live) – 4:19
"Love Can Move Mountains" (Live) – 4:53
"The Prayer" (with Andrea Bocelli) – 4:30
"Treat Her Like a Lady" (Video) – 4:19

Charts

Release history

References

External links

1999 singles
Celine Dion songs
Songs written by Billy Mann
Songs written by Andy Marvel
Songs written by Celine Dion
Song recordings produced by Ric Wake
1995 songs
Diana King songs
Columbia Records singles
Epic Records singles